Indira Institute of Engineering and Technology is an engineering college in Pandur, Thiruvallur, Tamil Nadu, India. The college is affiliated to Anna University Chennai.

Courses offered

Undergraduate courses

 B.E. - Civil Engineering
 B.E. - Computer Science and Engineering
 B.E. - Electrical and Electronics Engineering
 B.E. - Electronics and Communication Engineering
 B.E. - Mechanical Engineering
 B.Tech. - Information Technology

Postgraduate course
 ME - Computer Science Engineering
 ME - CAD / CAM
 ME - Construction Engineering and Management
 ME - Power Systems Engineering

 MBA - Master of Business Applications

Facilities
 Hostels
 Library
 Mess
 Labs
 Transportation

References

External links
 

Engineering colleges in Tamil Nadu
Colleges affiliated to Anna University
Education in Tiruvallur district
Educational institutions established in 2007
2007 establishments in Tamil Nadu